Comet Finlay is a periodic comet with an orbital period of 6 years discovered by William Henry Finlay (Royal Observatory, Cape of Good Hope, South Africa) on September 26, 1886. The next perihelion passage is July 13, 2021 when the comet will have a solar elongation of 54 degrees at approximately apparent magnitude 10. It last came to perihelion on December 27, 2014, at around magnitude 10. Of the numbered periodic comets, the orbit of 15P/Finlay has one of the smallest minimum orbit intersection distances with the orbit of Earth (E-MOID). In October 2060 the comet will pass about 5 million km from Earth.

Description 

When the first orbit calculations were made in 1886, there was a similarity between this orbit and that of Francesco de Vico's lost periodic comet of 1844 (54P/de Vico-Swift-NEAT). Lewis Boss (Dudley Observatory, Schenectady, United States) noted large discrepancies between the orbits and after further observations concluded that de Vico's comet could not be the same as Finlay's.

During the 1906 apparition the comet brightened to magnitude 6. In 1910 a close pass with Jupiter increased the orbital period, in 1919 the path was off predictions and a new comet discovered by Sasaki (Kyoto Observatory, Japan) on October 25, 1919, was discovered to be Finlay's.

The magnitude of the comet declined after 1926, and it was not until 1953 that it has been observed on every return.

2014–2015 
During the 2014 perihelion passage the comet outburst on 16 December 2014 from magnitude 11 to magnitude 9 becoming bright enough to be seen in common binoculars with a 50 mm objective lens. On December 23, 2014, 15P and Mars were only 1/6 of a degree apart in the sky after sunset. But by December 23, 2014, the comet had dimmed considerably since the outburst. On 16 January 2015, the comet outburst to magnitude 8.

2060 
This will be one of the closest comet approaches to Earth.

Arids meteor shower 
Debris ejected during the 1995 perihelion passage generated a meteor shower on 29-30 September 2021 radiating from the southern constellation of Ara. More outbursts are expected on 7 October 2021 from the 2008 and 2014 streams.

References

External links 
 Orbital simulation from JPL (Java) / Horizons Ephemeris
 Elements and Ephemeris for 15P/Finlay – Minor Planet Center
 15P at Kronk's Cometography
 15P at Kazuo Kinoshita's Comets
 15P at Seiichi Yoshida's Comet Catalog
 15P at CometBase database
  2014 June 22 recovery at apmag 20 (comets-ml)
 15P/Finlay on 18 Dec 2014 (200mm lens F5.6 / Rob Kaufman of Australia)
 Animation of 15P/Finlay by FRAM (0.3-m f/10 reflector + CCD, MPC I47), 17th and 18th Dec 2014 (Martin Masek)

Periodic comets
015P
0015
Comets in 2014
20210713
18860926